Aurantiporus is a genus of poroid fungi in the family Meruliaceae. Circumscribed by American mycologist William Alphonso Murrill in 1905, the genus contains five species found mostly in northern temperate regions. Molecular analysis of several Aurantiporus species suggests that the genus is not monophyletic, but some other related polypore species need to be sequenced and studied before appropriate taxonomic changes can be made. In 2018, Viktor Papp and Bálint Dima proposed a new genus Odoria to contain Aurantiporus alborubescens based on multigene phylogenetic analyses. The generic name is derived from the Latin aurantius ("orange") and the Ancient Greek  (pore).

Species
Aurantiporus albidus Rajchenb. & Cwielong (1995) – Argentina
Aurantiporus alborubescens (Bourdot & Galzin) H.Jahn (1973) – Europe
Aurantiporus fissilis (Berk. & M.A.Curtis) H.Jahn ex Ryvarden (1978) – Europe
Aurantiporus pilotae (Schwein.) Murrill (1905)
Aurantiporus transformatus (Núñez & Ryvarden) Spirin & Zmitr. (2006)

References

Taxa described in 1905
Meruliaceae
Polyporales genera
Taxa named by William Alphonso Murrill